The Ultimate Gary Glitter – 25 Years of Hits is a greatest hits album by English glam rock singer Gary Glitter. It was originally released in the United Kingdom in 1997 on the label Snapper Music, days after his arrest for possession of child pornography.

The two-disc set contains 27 of Gary Glitter's singles spanning from 1972 through to 1984 as well as "Rock Hard Men" from a then-upcoming album that was cancelled due to his arrest in 1997, and later conviction in 1999 for possession of child pornography before being released as On in 2001, and the set also includes 4 singles by his former backing band the Glitter Band without him, but it does not contain material he released under any of his aliases.

The album was reissued in 2000 without any alterations.

Critical reception
Steve Huey of AllMusic gave the album four and a half out of five stars and wrote that "the two-disc, 32-track anthology The Ultimate (Best Of) is perhaps the largest Gary Glitter package it would be reasonable to assemble" adding that "for the casual fan, two discs of Glitter may be slightly wearing, but for the hardcore fan who has to have all of Glitter's best moments and doesn't mind a little inconsistency, Ultimate is a purchase that's hard to argue with."

Track listing

References

External links

1997 compilation albums
Gary Glitter albums